Ellis Jenkins (born 29 April 1993) is a Welsh rugby union flanker who currently plays for the Cardiff Rugby and for the Wales national team.

Career

Cardiff Rugby
Jenkins made his debut for Cardiff in 2011 having previously played for their academy team and Cardiff RFC. He has been a regular member of the first-choice team since 2014, and was part of the victorious team that beat Gloucester in the final of the 2017–18 European Rugby Challenge Cup.

International career
Jenkins was a Wales under-20 international, captaining the side at the 2012 and 2013 Junior World Cup where Wales finished as runners up. Jenkins captained team consisting of a number of future Wales senior internationals: in the 2012 championship he captained the side which became the first side from any country to defeat New Zealand at that level. His team-mates that day included future senior Wales regulars Rob Evans and Samson Lee as well as several other players who would go on to earn senior Wales caps including Tom Prydie, Dan Baker, Eli Walker and Matthew Morgan, as well as future Scotland international Luke Hamilton. In 2013, Jenkins would captain the side which finished runners-up, Wales' best performance at U20 level to date.

Jenkins would have to bide his time before making his senior Wales appearance, in part due to intense competition for places in the Wales back row from the likes of Sam Warburton, Dan Lydiate, Justin Tipuric, Josh Navidi and Aaron Shingler. He finally made his debut aged 23 on the 2016 tour of New Zealand, coming off the bench in all three tests. He would captain Wales for the first time against South Africa in Washington, D.C. during the 2018 Wales rugby union tour to Argentina and the United States.

Unfortunately, during the final match against South Africa national rugby union team of the Under Armour Autumn Series, Jenkins suffered from a torn AC, MCL and numerous damages to the tendons in his left knee. This left him in rehabilitation up until now, leaving his availability for the 2019 Rugby World Cup looking unlikely.

Personal life 
Jenkins has been engaged with Welsh actress and singer Sophie Evans since they were teenagers.

References

External links 
Cardiff Blues Player Profile
Wales profile
 

1993 births
Living people
Cardiff Rugby players
Rugby union players from Church Village
Welsh rugby union players
Rugby union flankers
Wales international rugby union players